Hu Weiwei (Chinese: 胡威威; Pinyin: Hú Wēiwēi; born 3 March 1993) is a Chinese footballer who currently plays for Shenzhen Ledman in the China League Two.

Club career
Hu started his football career with China League Two side Dongguan Nancheng in 2011. Playing as a winger in the team, he scored one goal in sixteen appearances for the club in the 2011 season. Dongguan Nancheng lost to Chongqing F.C. 3–0 on aggregate in the semi-finals during the promotion playoffs which meant they failed to promote to China League One directly, and then lost to Fujian Smart Hero 2–0 in the third-place playoff and failed to enter to the relegation playoffs. Although Dongguan Nancheng was deemed as one of the hottest clubs for promotion in the 2012 season, they were knocked out from the group stage by finished the sixth place in south group. Hu played seventeen league matches and scored a goal during the 2012 season.

Hu transferred to Chinese Super League giant Guangzhou Evergrande along with his teammates Fang Jingqi, Liao Lisheng, Yang Chaosheng, Li Weixin, Zhang Xingbo and Wang Rui in November 2012. He made his debut for Guangzhou on 7 August 2013 in the fifth round of 2013 Chinese FA Cup in a 2–2 draw against Hangzhou Greentown but winning 5–3 in the penalty shootout, coming on as a substitute for Shi Hongjun in the 68th minute. His league debut for Guangzhou came on 15 October 2013 in a 1–1 away draw against Liaoning Whowin, coming on as a substitute for Zhang Hongnan in the 47th minute.

On 11 February 2015, Hu transferred to China League One side Qingdao Jonoon.
In March 2018, Hu transferred to China League Two side Shenzhen Ledman.

International career
Hu scored nine goals in five matches for the Chinese under-17 national team during 2010 AFC U-16 Championship qualification. He played all three group stage matches for China in the 2010 AFC U-16 Championship.

Career statistics 
Statistics accurate as of match played 13 October 2018.

Honours

Club
Guangzhou Evergrande
Chinese Super League: 2013, 2014
AFC Champions League: 2013

References

Living people
1993 births
Hakka sportspeople
People from Wuhua
Association football forwards
Chinese footballers
Footballers from Meizhou
Guangzhou F.C. players
Qingdao Hainiu F.C. (1990) players
Chinese Super League players
China League One players
21st-century Chinese people